The 72nd Primetime Emmy Awards honored the best in American prime time television programming from June 1, 2019, until May 31, 2020, as chosen by the Academy of Television Arts & Sciences. The ceremony was originally to be held at the Microsoft Theater in Los Angeles, California, but due to the COVID-19 pandemic, it was instead hosted from the Staples Center, while winners gave speeches remotely from their homes or other locations. It aired live on September 20, 2020, following the 72nd Primetime Creative Arts Emmy Awards on September 14–17 and 19. During the ceremony, Emmy Awards were handed out in 23 categories. The ceremony was produced by Done and Dusted, directed by Hamish Hamilton, and broadcast in the United States by ABC. Jimmy Kimmel served as host for the third time.

At the main ceremony, Schitt's Creek won all seven comedy categories including Outstanding Comedy Series, becoming the first comedy series to complete a sweep of those categories. Succession and Watchmen each won four awards, including Outstanding Drama Series and Outstanding Limited Series, respectively. Other winning programs include Euphoria, I Know This Much Is True, Last Week Tonight with John Oliver, The Morning Show, Mrs. America, Ozark, RuPaul's Drag Race, and Unorthodox. Including Creative Arts Emmys, Watchmen led all programs with 11 wins and 26 nominations, while HBO took home 30 awards to lead all networks.

Winners and nominees

The nominations for the 72nd Primetime Emmy Awards were announced on July 28, 2020, by host Leslie Jones and presenters Laverne Cox, Josh Gad, and Tatiana Maslany. Watchmen led all programs with 26 total nominations between the main ceremony and the 72nd Primetime Creative Arts Emmy Awards, followed by The Marvelous Mrs. Maisel with 20 and Ozark and Succession with 18 each. Netflix led all networks and platforms with 160 nominations, beating the record of 137 set by HBO the previous year. Disney+, Apple TV+, and Quibi all received their first Emmy nominations and wins this year.

The winners were announced on September 20. Schitt's Creek became the first series to sweep all seven comedy categories and the second to ever complete a sweep, following Angels in America as a miniseries in 2004. It also became the first Canadian program to win the overall comedy or drama series award and set a record for most Emmys for a Canadian series. Additionally, it became the first comedy series to win all four main acting categories in a single year and the first show overall to sweep the acting categories since Angels in America. Combined with its two Creative Arts Emmys, the show became the most awarded comedy in a single year with nine wins, breaking The Marvelous Mrs. Maisels record of eight from 2018 and 2019.

Dan Levy won four awards for Schitt's Creek to tie Moira Demos and Amy Sherman-Palladino for the most wins for an individual in one year, while he and Eugene Levy became the first father-son duo to win Emmys in the same year. For her work on Euphoria, Zendaya became the youngest winner in the Lead Actress in a Drama Series category at 24 years old, breaking Jodie Comer's record from the previous year. She also became the second black actress to win the category, following Viola Davis in 2015. Regina King's win for her performance in Watchmen marked her fourth career Emmy, tying her with Alfre Woodard for the most wins by a black performer. Zendaya and King were also two of the seven black winners for acting in comedy, drama, or limited series, breaking the record of six.

Winners are listed first, highlighted in boldface, and indicated with a double dagger (‡). For simplicity, producers who received nominations for program awards have been omitted.

Programs

Acting

Lead performances

Supporting performances

Directing

Writing

Governors Award 
The Governors Award was presented to Tyler Perry and The Perry Foundation "in recognition of their unparalleled contributions to shaping the television medium" and for their "inclusion, engagement, employment and other philanthropic initiatives". The award was moved to the main telecast from its usual presentation at the Creative Arts Emmys.

Nominations and wins by program 
For the purposes of the lists below, "major" constitutes the categories listed above (program, acting, directing, and writing), while "total" includes the categories presented at the Creative Arts Emmy Awards.

Nominations and wins by network

Presenters 
The awards were presented by the following people:

Ceremony information 

As part of a rotating deal among the "Big Four" networks signed in 2018, ABC held the rights to broadcast the 72nd Primetime Emmy Awards. On January 8, 2020, during the Television Critics Association's annual winter tour, ABC announced that the ceremony would be broadcast on September 20 from the Microsoft Theater in Los Angeles, while the Creative Arts ceremonies would be held on September 12 and 13. However, the COVID-19 pandemic led to significant changes. The Academy of Television Arts & Sciences, also known as the Television Academy, announced on June 15 that the Creative Arts ceremonies would be presented virtually due to the pandemic. Additionally, the annual Governors Ball was cancelled for the first time in its history, with the Television Academy making a $1 million donation to the Actors Fund's COVID-19 efforts in its place. The new Creative Arts dates were announced in August, with the ceremonies to be aired across five nights between September 14 and 19. On July 29, the main ceremony was moved to a remote format as well.

Jimmy Kimmel was announced as the ceremony's host on June 16. This year marked his third time as host, following 2012 and 2016. Kimmel also served as an executive producer for the event. In July, Guy Carrington, Reginald Hudlin, David Jammy, and Ian Stewart were added as executive producers, with Done and Dusted producing the ceremony. Hamish Hamilton served as director for the event.

While Kimmel presented the ceremony from the Staples Center, no in-person festivities (such as a red carpet or audience) at the venue took place. Celebrity guests still made on-stage appearances, including Jennifer Aniston and Anthony Anderson. The broadcast used live feeds from each nominee, with television series being represented by one of their producers. A notable exception was Schitt's Creek, whose cast and crew appeared together from a viewing party in Toronto. To maintain a high-quality presentation, the use of video-conferencing was avoided, with producers sending "professional" cameras to each nominee's location, as well as an operator, if they so chose. Hudlin stated that they wanted to maintain a live broadcast, while Stewart argued that "we're not trying to make the Zoomies, we're trying to make the Emmys". Staples Center was chosen as the venue to ensure that appropriate social distancing could be practiced among crew members, and because it could support the infrastructure needed for the large number of remote feeds that would be used (estimated to be around 140).

A number of comedy gags acknowledged the pandemic and the format of the ceremony. Kimmel's opening monologue featured a laugh track and footage of audience reactions from past Emmy ceremonies. After using a clip that depicted Kimmel himself as an audience member, he revealed the empty arena, and seats with cardboard cut-outs of nominees (except for the real Jason Bateman, whom Kimmel told could stay if he promised to laugh at his jokes; Bateman left). Kimmel was also seen disinfecting the envelope for Outstanding Lead Actress in a Comedy Series with Lysol spray; after Aniston commented that it was "a little extreme", Kimmel proceeded to throw it in a trash can and set it on fire instead. Some awards were delivered to winners via presenters in themed Hazmat suits designed to look like formalwear.

Category and rule changes 
Several rule changes were announced in December 2019. First, episodes that were scheduled to air after the eligibility period closed, known as hanging episodes, were eligible for awards if they were made available on a member-accessible platform, such as the Television Academy's streaming platform, before May 31, 2020. Otherwise, those episodes would be eligible at the following year's ceremony. For limited series, all episodes had to be made available before May 31, or the series as a whole would have to compete the following year. Other changes included the elimination of DVD screeners to save money and waste, as well as a limit on actors playing the same character across multiple series – only one performance for that character could be submitted in a given year. Programs broadcast during prime time hours as an extension of daytime series were no longer eligible, and self-published programming had to be vetted to determine if it was "suitably competitive".

In March 2020, the deadline for hanging episodes was extended to June 30 due to production delays stemming from the COVID-19 pandemic; the nomination and voting periods were similarly delayed. All shows were still required to premiere before May 31 to be eligible for the 2020 ceremony. "For Your Consideration" events were initially moved from live settings to virtual events due to the pandemic, but were later suspended entirely.

On June 17, 2020, it was announced that the number of nominees in the Outstanding Comedy and Drama Series categories had been increased from seven to eight, regardless of the number of submissions. The number of nominees had last been increased in 2015, from six to seven. The Television Academy cited a 15% increase in submissions as the reason for the change. In other categories, a sliding scale based on the number of submissions would be used to determine the number of nominees; paired performance categories, such as supporting actor and actress in a comedy, would have the same number of nominees. The changes led to the elimination of the "2% rule", where submissions within two percent of the fifth-place nominee would also receive a nomination.

On August 6, alongside the announcement of the Creative Arts ceremony dates, four categories were moved from the main ceremony to Creative Arts ceremonies: Directing for a Variety Series, Writing for a Variety Series, Variety Sketch Series, and Television Movie. This left 23 categories to be presented at the main ceremony. Additionally, the Governors Award was moved from its usual presentation at a Creative Arts ceremony to the main ceremony.

Critical reviews and viewership 
The broadcast received generally positive reviews from critics. Times Judy Berman called the ceremony "one of the most enjoyable awards shows in recent memory" thanks not to one major decision but instead due to the many details that succeeded. She felt Kimmel's turn as host provided some energy and consistency, even as his performance was simply okay. Linda Holmes of NPR also noted that the broadcast "wasn't just watchable; it was ... pretty good", with the remote setup providing a level of intimacy and unpredictability missing from other awards shows. IndieWires Ben Travers called it "a memorable, entertaining, and technically immaculate awards show", praising the technical team and the decision to favor live speeches over recorded segments.

Mike Hale of The New York Times was more critical of the ceremony, remarking that the Emmys "continued [their] trend of feeling out of tune with the way most of us watch TV". He added that the remote appearances and pretaped portions evoked nostalgia for "the hothouse atmosphere and occasional breakdowns" of live ceremonies, with spontaneity replaced by "stage-managed banality". Hank Stuever, writing for The Washington Post, found that the ceremony "more than met the challenge that the pandemic handed it" but failed to inspire any permanent ideas for changes to the awards show format. Robert Lloyd remarked in the Los Angeles Times that the show "felt solid enough to accommodate the occasional technical difficulty", adding that because almost everything was unprecedented, it was "minute for minute more interesting than these long nights of self-celebration usually are". He found that Kimmel was the right host for the event, providing "a walking dose of normality" to the proceedings.

The ceremony was watched by 6.36 million viewers in the United States, falling below the previous year's ceremony to become the least-watched Emmys telecast in history. It achieved a 1.3 rating among adults ages 18–49, also a record low. The ceremony faced competition from both an NFL broadcast and, for the first time, a playoff game for the NBA. Additionally, the ceremony lacked a red carpet show leading into the ceremony, which may have affected viewership.

Criticism regarding lack of diversity
Following the nomination announcement, the Television Academy was criticized for its lack of transgender nominees. Several cast members and affiliates of the FX drama Pose, which is set in New York City's LGBT ballroom scene, criticized the Television Academy for excluding its many transgender stars from the acting categories. There was similar criticism from affiliates of the HBO series Euphoria, for which transgender actress Hunter Schafer did not receive a nomination despite critical acclaim. However, despite these snubs, Rain Valdez became the second transgender person to be nominated for a Primetime Emmy for acting, receiving a nomination for Outstanding Actress in a Short Form Comedy or Drama Series.

Further criticism resulted from the lack of Latino nominees. While there was a record number of black nominees, there was limited recognition for shows starring Latino casts and only one Latino or Latina nomination in any acting category (Alexis Bledel for Outstanding Guest Actress in a Drama Series). The Congressional Hispanic Caucus called the lack of nominations a "demoralizing disappointment for the U.S.'s largest minority group". When the Los Angeles Times reported the criticism using the terms "Black" and "Latino" separately, it was itself criticized for failing to recognize Afro-Latinos. John Leguizamo boycotted the Emmys because of its lack of Latino nominees, remarking, "If you don't have Latin people, there's no reason for me to see it." Before the nominations were announced, Porter suggested that his Pose co-star Mj Rodriguez, who is transgender and Afro-Latina, was not receiving recognition because the Television Academy's members "don't know how to adjudicate the performance" and so simply exclude it.

The Emmys also faced criticism from the Asian American community, leveled because Asian Americans only made up one percent of the nominees. The relative lack of nominations was attributed to both the small number of shows featuring Asian Americans and the perception among some voters that such shows are niche or foreign. Mindy Kaling, creator of Never Have I Ever, criticized the Emmys for not nominating the series for any Emmy categories despite its success, suggesting that it was overlooked because "Sometimes a show like ours will always seem ethnic or niche to a certain group of people."

In Memoriam 
The annual In Memoriam segment featured H.E.R. performing "Nothing Compares 2 U" on piano and electric guitar.

 Regis Philbin – host
 Naya Rivera – actor
 Adam Schlesinger – songwriter
 Caroll Spinney – actor
 Herb Granath – executive
 Dorothy "D.C." Fontana – writer
 James Lipton – host
 Jim Lehrer – broadcaster
 Shirley Knight – actor
 Robert Conrad – actor
 Silvio Horta – writer
 Robert Forster – actor
 Thomas L. Miller – producer
 Lee Mendelson – producer
 Rick Ludwin – executive
 Fred Willard – actor
 Jas Waters – writer
 Brian Dennehy – actor
 Leonard Goldberg – producer
 David Bellisario – producer
 René Auberjonois – actor
 Rip Taylor – actor
 Mary Rose – costume designer
 Ken Osmond – actor
 Hugh Downs – broadcaster
 Lynn Shelton – director
 Wilford Brimley – actor
 Jerry Stiller – actor
 Ian Holm – actor
 Kellye Nakahara – actor
 Gene Reynolds – director
 Buck Henry – writer
 Lyle Waggoner – actor
 Bill Macy – actor
 John Witherspoon – actor
 Phyllis George – sportscaster
 Nanci Ryder – publicist
 Diana Rigg – actor
 Gil Schwartz – executive
 Diahann Carroll – actor
 Sumner Redstone – executive
 Max von Sydow – actor
 Fred Silverman – executive
 Carl Reiner – actor
 Ja'Net DuBois – actor
 Kirk Douglas – actor
 Chadwick Boseman – actor

Before the In Memoriam montage, Kimmel paid tribute to United States Supreme Court Justice Ruth Bader Ginsburg, who died two days before the ceremony. A speech recorded by Boseman was played at the end of the montage.

Notes

References

External links
 72nd Primetime Emmy Awards at Emmys.com
 
 2020 Emmy Awards episode submissions at Gold Derby
 Academy of Television Arts & Sciences website

2020 awards in the United States
2020 in American television
2020 television awards
2020 television specials
Impact of the COVID-19 pandemic on television
072
September 2020 events in the United States
Television shows directed by Hamish Hamilton (director)